Atila Septar (born 2 June 1996) is a French-Romanian rugby union football player. He plays as a centre or wing for Toulon.

Club career
Atila Septar played for CA Brive for two seasons and currently plays for Top 14 team, Pau after playing between 2016 and 2018 for Clermont.

International career

Junior career
Septar played for the France Under–20 rugby union team during the 2016 Six Nations Under 20s Championship playing in three matches.

Senior career
In October 2022, Atila was called for Romania's national team, the Oaks, making his international debut during Week 2 of the 2022 end-of-year rugby union internationals in a match against Chilean Los Cóndores. On this occasion he scored his first try for the national team.

Personal life
Atila Septar is the son of Romanian former International Rugby Union player, Erdinci Septar.

References

External links
 
 
 
 
 Atila Septar profile at LNR
 Atila Septar profile at L'Équipe
 Atila Septar profile at Eurosport
 Atila Septar profile at ALL.RUGBY

1996 births
Living people
Sportspeople from Limoges
French people of Romanian descent
French people of Tatar descent
Romanian people of Crimean Tatar descent
French rugby union players
Romanian rugby union players
Romania international rugby union players
Rugby union centres
Rugby union wings
CA Brive players
ASM Clermont Auvergne
Section Paloise players
RC Toulonnais players
Rugby sevens players at the 2014 Summer Youth Olympics
Youth Olympic gold medalists for France